"Headlines" is a song by Swedish pop group Alcazar. The song was an entry in Melodifestivalen 2010 for the Eurovision Song Contest 2010, where it reached the "Second Chance" which was held on March 6, 2010 at Conventum Arena in Örebro. However, they failed to qualify for the final after a public televote. No music video was shot to promote the single afterwards.

Formats and track listings
These are the formats and track listings of promotional single releases of "Headlines".

CD single
"Headlines" Radio Edit - 3:03  (Peter Boström, Tony Nilsson) 
"Headlines" Karaoke Version - 2:59  (Peter Boström, Tony Nilsson)

Chart performance
The song made its debut on Swedish Singles Charts at number 24 on March 5, 2010. The next week, the song managed to climb at number 10, giving Alcazar another Top 10 hit in Sweden.

See also
Melodifestivalen 2010

References

External links
Alcazar Official Website

Alcazar (band) songs
Melodifestivalen songs of 2010
2010 singles
Songs written by Tony Nilsson
Songs written by Peter Boström
Universal Records singles
2009 songs